Carlos José Ramos dos Santos (22 September 1934 – 9 May 2020), better known as simply Carlos José, was a Brazilian singer-songwriter of the genre seresta.

Life
He started his singing career at Um Instante Maestro, a radio program created by Flávio Cavalcanti and broadcast at Rádio Nacional Rio de Janeiro.

Active from 1957 to 2020, José released eight studio albums and one extended play from 1959 to 2005, with two of them being a compilation of greatest hits.

Aside from musical career, Carlos José also had a law degree, and practiced law for a couple of years before giving up to pursue a full time musical career.

Personal life and death
On 9 May 2020, José died in Rio de Janeiro due to complications brought on by COVID-19 during the COVID-19 pandemic in Brazil.

At the time of his death, José was married to Vera Goulart. José also had two heirs from his previous marriage to journalist Maria D'Ajuda.

Discography

Studio albums

Extended plays

References

External links
 

1934 births
People from São Paulo
20th-century Brazilian male singers
20th-century Brazilian singers
21st-century Brazilian male singers
21st-century Brazilian singers
2020 deaths
Brazilian male singer-songwriters
Deaths from the COVID-19 pandemic in Rio de Janeiro (state)